A patron is a person or organization that supports another.

Patron or Patrón may also refer to:

Common uses
 Customer
 Patreon subscriber
 Patron god
 Patron saint
 Sponsor, a patron of a bill

People
Patricio Patrón Laviada (born 1957), Mexican politician who served as Governor of Yucatán
Elena Patron (1933–2021), Filipino scriptwriter, novelist, poet, dramatist, essayist, and magazine columnist
Giselle Patrón (born 1987), Peruvian model and actress
Pablo Escobar (1949–1993), Colombian drug lord nicknamed “El Patrón”
Patron (rapper) (born 1988), Turkish rapper

Arts, entertainment, and media
 Patron (2021 video game)
 El Patrón (album), by Puerto Rican singer-songwriter Tito El Bambino
 Purp & Patron, two mixtapes and the first double disc mixtape by rapper Game

Animals 
 Patron (dog), a Ukrainian bomb-sniffing dog and mascot
 Patron (horse), a racehorse

Other uses
 Patrón, a brand of tequila
 Pizza Patrón, an American pizza chain

See also 
 Advowson, by which in the Church of England the patron of a benefice has the right to nominate a parish priest to fill a vacancy
 Ius patronatus, a right of patronage in the Roman Catholic Church
 Patronage (disambiguation)
 Pattern, type of theme of recurring events or objects